Tomás Francisco Gutiérrez Chávez (March 7, 1817 – July 26, 1872) was a Peruvian Colonel who, along with his brothers, led a coup against President José Balta Montero and served as the Supreme Leader of Peru for four days in July 1872. From July 22, 1872 to July 26, 1872, Gutiérrez was the de facto leader of Peru and the self-proclaimed "Supreme Leader of the Republic." He was overthrown just four days after his proclamation and lynched. Peru later regained some political stability with the election of Manuel Pardo, although this stability was short-lived as a foreign threat began to arise in Chile.

Early life 
Gutiérrez was born in Huancarqui to a family of Spanish descent in March of 1817, the third child and first son of parents Luis Gutiérrez and Julia Chávez in what was then the Viceroyalty of Peru. He worked as a muleteer, known also as an arriero, and later enlisted himself in the army. His three younger brothers—Silvestre, Marcelino and Marceliano—followed his example, although without distinguishing themselves, as Tomás did.

Military career 
Gutiérrez was first ascended to Infantry Sergeant Major in 1854 and then travelled to Arequipa to take part in the revolution headed by Ramón Castilla. He participated in the march on Lima and for his outstanding performance in the battle of La Palma, fought on January 5, 1855, he was promoted to lieutenant colonel.

During the second government of Castilla he fought against the revolution led by Manuel Ignacio de Vivanco in Arequipa, which led to the bloody Peruvian Civil War of 1856–1858. Due to his merits in the final assault on Arequipa, he was promoted to colonel on March 7, 1858. Elected deputy for the province of Castilla, he attended the legislatures of 1858-1859. He also participated in the campaign against Ecuador.

As head of the Áncash battalion, he supported the governments of Presidents Miguel de San Román (1862-1863) and Juan Antonio Pezet (1863-1865). He stood out fighting in defense of the Pezet government against Colonel Mariano Ignacio Prado's revolution of 1865, for which he was promoted to general. While the advance of the revolutionaries towards Lima was taking place, he pacified the population of Callao who had spoken out in favor of Vice President Pedro Diez Canseco, but after the fall of Pezet he was arrested and his promotion to general was annulled on December 13, 1865.

Deposed from the rank hierarchy, he enlisted as a simple soldier in the Depósito Battalion and participated together with his brothers in the Battle of Callao on May 2, 1866. After the conflict with Spain, he moved to Tarapacá and joined the revolution that in defense of the Constitution of 1860 was headed by Marshal Castilla, who ratified him as a general and appointed him commander general of his hunting units, in April 1867. He accompanied the Marshal in the last moments of his life. With the revolution having come to an end because of Castilla's death, he returned to Lima.

Shortly after, he joined the uprising that broke out in Arequipa against the Prado government and the Constitution of 1867, led by Vice President Pedro Diez Canseco, who recognized Tomás as a general. He contributed to the defense of Arequipa against the attack of the government troops, and then followed the triumphant troops of Diez Canseco, arriving in Callao on January 22, 1868. Sent to Chiclayo to fight the revolution of Colonel José Balta, he did not want to use arms against the people, and returned to Lima to report on the situation.

After the election of Balta as president and the installation of Congress, on August 12, 1868, the promotions granted by President Pezet were declared invalid, and once again he was lowered to the rank of colonel. President Balta appointed him Inspector General of the Army and proposed to Congress his promotion to general, but the respective law was never issued. Despite this, Tomás gave decided support to Balta's government, and so did his brothers, also Colonels, who were at the head of the battalions that garrisoned Lima. It was mainly due to this support that Balta's government enjoyed stability, even before the coup that the brothers themselves would star in a few days before the end of it.

Under Balta, Gutiérrez was able to provide funds for the reconstruction of the San Nicolás de Tolentino Church in Huancarqui after it was destroyed in the 1868 Arica earthquake.

Gutiérrez was appointed Minister of War and Navy in 1871, a fact that was received with alarm by the recently founded Civilista Party, the same one that at that time triumphed in the general elections, leading to the presidency of Manuel Pardo y Lavalle.

Coup d'état 

The 1872 elections in Peru had produced a victory for Manuel Pardo, who was to become the first civilian president in the history of Peru. Shortly before Pardo was to take office, however, Gutiérrez, serving as President Balta's Defense Minister, organized a coup d'état. On July 22, 1872, Silvestre Gutiérrez, at the head of two companies of the Pichincha battalion, entered the Government Palace and arrested President Balta. He immediately went to the Plaza de Armas, where his brother Marceliano was in command of the Zepita battalion; both declared President Balta removed from office and proclaimed Tomás Gutiérrez as General of the Army and Supreme Head of the Republic.

Gutiérrez proclaimed himself Supreme Leader of the Republic and asked for the support of the armed forces. However, only some of the Army agreed to support him, and the Navy issued a statement on July 23 which made it clear that they would not support the new regime. This statement was signed by notable figures, such as Miguel Grau. The citizens of Lima did not support Gutiérrez either, and the situation soon became violent. On July 26, Silvestre Gutiérrez was assassinated while he was going to take the tram at the San Juan de Dios Station. It is alleged that in retaliation, Marceliano Gutiérrez, who was guarding Balta in the San Francisco barracks, ordered the assassination of the imprisoned president, although such an assertion has not been proven. Nonetheless, Balta was riddled with bullets by three riflemen, while he was resting in his bed after having lunch, and the news of his death quickly spread throughout Lima.

Overthrow and death 

Seeing that the atmosphere had turned against him, Tomás Gutiérrez left the Government Palace and moved to the Santa Catalina barracks, where his brother, Colonel Marcelino Gutiérrez, was staying. There he suffered the siege of the population. The two brothers then decided to leave the barracks at night, amidst rifle and cannon fire. Meanwhile, the other brother, Marceliano, went to Callao, where he died fighting against the rebellious people, on July 26.

While Marcelino took refuge in the house of a friendly family, Tomás, recklessly, fled through the streets of Lima, with his face covered and wearing a civilian hat, shouting "Viva Pardo" with the intention of going unnoticed. To his bad luck, he ran into a group of officers who recognized him immediately. Upon being arrested, he claimed that he had been incited to rebel by prominent politicians and military men, who abandoned him and claimed to know nothing of the assassination of President Balta. They advanced a few blocks, while they were followed by a mob that shouted threats, and when they reached the La Merced square, the soldiers who arrested him could not protect him any further and hid him in a pharmacy, immediately closing the doors. The crowd broke through the doors and searched for Tomás, whom they found hiding in a tub. He was then shot dead, and his body taken out to the street. There, the corpse was undressed and shot, as well as slashed across the chest by an unknown man, who was alleged to have said, alluding to the presidential sash:

He was immediately dragged into the plaza and hung from a lantern in front of the Portal de Escribanos. Hours later he was joined by the corpse of his brother Silvestre, brought from a nearby church. The brothers' houses were also reduced to rubble. Both bodies were then hanged from the towers of the Cathedral of Lima, naked and covered with wounds, at a height of more than 20 meters; a spectacle never before seen in the capital. Hours later the ropes that supported them were broken, the bodies falling to the ground, which crashed against the sidewalk. The remains were burned in the center of the square and in the afternoon a third corpse was thrown into the fire, that of Marceliano.Ambiguous

Days later, Manuel Pardo made his entrance into the capital and assumed command of the Nation on August 2, 1872. He then made a speech that began with the words:

The only one of the Gutiérrez brothers who managed to save himself was Marcelino, described as the most peaceful of the brothers, who took refuge in a friendly house and thus managed to save himself from being lynched. Captured days later, he served prison for some time and was released by an amnesty law; he then he participated in the defense of Lima, during the War of the Pacific, fighting in the Battle of San Juan and Chorrillos and in the Battle of Miraflores, in 1881. He died of tuberculosis in 1904.

The four-day regime of Tomás Gutiérrez did not halt the increasing control of civilians in the Peruvian government. Just one week after Gutiérrez's overthrow, Pardo assumed the presidency and his party, the Civilista Party, would be a dominant force in Peruvian politics for decades to come.

External links
Worldstatesmen.org - Perú

See also 
 History of Peru
 List of assassinated and executed heads of state and government

Notes

References 

Leaders who took power by coup
1872 deaths
Assassinated Peruvian politicians
People murdered in Peru
Assassinated heads of state
1817 births
 Peruvian people of Spanish descent
 Peruvian people of Galician descent
Presidents of Peru
People from Arequipa